No 5 dumb hopper barge, since being scuttled known as  the No. 5 Barge, Zanoni Barge and Ardrossan Barge,  was a hopper barge which was built in 1911 at Balmain in New South Wales by Poole & Steel for the then Marine Board of South Australia, an agency of the Government of South Australia.  She was part of a fleet of vessels used to dredge the shipping approaches to Port Adelaide and other ports in South Australia.  Her specific role was to hold spoil from the dredging process and convey it under tow to a dumping site. In 1978, she became redundant after the purchase of two self-propelled barges.

See also
List of shipwrecks of Australia
List of shipwrecks in 1984
Ship graveyard

References

External links
“Snapper fishing Ardrossan South Australia.MP4” published on Jan 17, 2013

Barges
Ships built in Australia
1911 ships
Maritime incidents in 1984
Ships sunk as artificial reefs
Scuttled vessels
Ships of South Australia
Shipwrecks of South Australia
Gulf St Vincent